Anandha Ragam is a 1982 Indian Tamil-language romance film directed by Bharani, starring Sivakumar, Radha and Aruna. The film is based on the novel Alaigal Oivathillai by Thamarai Senthoorapandi. It was released on 14 January 1982.

Plot

Cast 
 Sivakumar
 Radha
 Aruna
 Sivachandran
 Ravikumar
 Goundamani
 Veera Raghavan
 V. R. Thilakam
 Indira Devi

Soundtrack 
The music was composed by Ilaiyaraaja.

Reception 
Sindhu Jeeva of Kalki gave a mixed review, saying the film failed to do justice to the novel and it lacked naturality, but praised Ilaiyaraaja's music.

References

External links 
 

1980s romance films
1980s Tamil-language films
1982 films
Films based on Indian novels
Films scored by Ilaiyaraaja
Films with screenplays by Panchu Arunachalam
Indian romance films